Piperine, along with its isomer chavicine, is the alkaloid responsible for the pungency of black pepper and long pepper. It has been used in some forms of traditional medicine.

Preparation
Due to its poor solubility in water, piperine is typically extracted from black pepper by using organic solvents like dichloromethane.  The amount of piperine varies from 1–2% in long pepper, to 5–10% in commercial white and black peppers.

Piperine can also be prepared by treating a concentrated alcoholic extract of black pepper with an alcoholic solution of potassium hydroxide to remove resin (said to contain chavicine, an isomer of piperine). The solution is decanted from the insoluble residue and left to stand overnight. During this period, the alkaloid slowly crystallizes from the solution.

Piperine has been synthesized by the action of piperonoyl chloride on piperidine.

Reactions
Piperine forms salts only with strong acids. The platinichloride B4·H2PtCl6 forms orange-red needles ("B" denotes one mole of the alkaloid base in this and the following formula). Iodine in potassium iodide added to an alcoholic solution of the base in the presence of a little hydrochloric acid gives a characteristic periodide, B2·HI·I2, crystallizing in steel-blue needles with melting point 145 °C.

Piperine can be hydrolyzed by an alkali into piperidine and piperic acid.

History
Piperine was discovered in 1819 by Hans Christian Ørsted, who isolated it from the fruits of Piper nigrum, the source plant of both black and white pepper. Piperine was also found in Piper longum and Piper officinarum (Miq.) C. DC. (=Piper retrofractum Vahl), two species called "long pepper".

Biochemistry and medicinal aspects
A component of pungency by piperine results from activation of the heat- and acidity-sensing transient receptor potential channel ion channels, TRPV1 and TRPA1, on nociceptors, the pain-sensing nerve cells. Piperine is under preliminary research for its potential to affect bioavailability of other compounds in food and dietary supplements, such as a possible effect on the bioavailability of curcumin.

See also 
Piperidine, a cyclic six-membered amine that results from hydrolysis of piperine
Piperic acid, the carboxylic acid also derived from hydrolysis of piperine
Capsaicin, the active piquant chemical in chili peppers
Allyl isothiocyanate, the active piquant chemical in mustard, radishes, horseradish, and wasabi
Allicin, the active piquant flavor chemical in raw garlic and onions (see those articles for discussion of other chemicals in them relating to pungency, and eye irritation)
Ilepcimide
Piperlongumine

References 

CYP1A2 inhibitors
CYP3A4 inhibitors
Piperidine alkaloids
Pungent flavors
Monoamine oxidase inhibitors
Carboxamides
Benzodioxoles
Polyenes
Enones
1-Piperidinyl compounds